Cornelius Bal (born 21 November 1951) is a Dutch former racing cyclist. He won the Tour of Flanders in 1974.

Palmarès

External links 

1951 births
Living people
Dutch male cyclists
Sportspeople from Borsele
Dutch Vuelta a España stage winners
Cyclists from Zeeland